Carlos "Charlie" Slusher (born 28 November 1971 in Belmopan) is a Belizean former professional football goalkeeper.

International career 
A veteran of the Belize national football team, Slusher made his debut in his country's first FIFA acknowledged competitive game, an UNCAF Cup match against El Salvador in November 1995. He lost his national team jersey in 2000 to Shane Orio but featured as a midfielder in Belize's UNCAF Nations Cup 2005 squads.

He has earned almost 10 caps since, playing in 2 World Cup qualification matches. He even scored a goal in a 7–1 demolition of Nicaragua in 2002.

International goals
Scores and results list Belize's goal tally first.

Honours
Belize Premier Football League: 2
 1999, 2001,

References

External links 
 Picture - Belize Football

Living people
1971 births
People from Belmopan
Association football goalkeepers
Belizean footballers
Belize international footballers
Belizean football managers
Belize national football team managers
2001 UNCAF Nations Cup players
2005 UNCAF Nations Cup players
2007 UNCAF Nations Cup players
FC Belize players